The United States presidential election in Alabama was held on November 4, 1980. Former California Governor Ronald Reagan narrowly won the state and its 9 electoral votes, winning 48.8% to Incumbent President Jimmy Carter’s 47.5%. John B. Anderson came in third place, winning 1.23%, although Alabama was Anderson’s weakest state in the entire country. Two other candidates, Conservative Party nominee John Rarick and Libertarian Party candidate Ed Clark, each received close to one percent of the vote.

Reagan's margin of victory largely rested upon his strong performances in Mobile and Baldwin counties along the Gulf Coast, and Jefferson and Shelby counties in the Birmingham metropolitan area. Reagan also won three counties home to large cities: Madison (Huntsville), Montgomery and Tuscaloosa. In contrast, Carter’s local appeal remained strong in the more rural counties of the state (except Winston County, a Republican bastion since the late 19th Century), and he won overwhelming victories in the Black Belt, where Carter’s 80.10% in Macon County was the highest proportion he received in any county nationwide.

The 1980 election would set up Alabama to become a Republican stronghold for future presidential elections, after having been part of the Democratic Solid South for most of its statehood since 1824. , this is the last election in which Limestone County, Morgan County, Marshall County, Talladega County, Cullman County, Tallapoosa County, Bibb County, Randolph County, Henry County, Lamar County, and Clay County voted for a Democratic presidential candidate.

Results

Result by county

See also
United States presidential elections in Alabama

References

1980
Alabama
1980 Alabama elections